Starship & Empire is a 1976 board wargame published by R-Squared Games.

Gameplay
Starship & Empire involves fleet maneuvering on a strategic scale, and uses a pseudo-3D movement system for tactical purposes.

Reception
Kevin P. Kenney reviewed Starship & Empire in The Space Gamer No. 7. He described the game as "a multi-level combination of many of the ideas present in other S-F games cleaned up and merged into one of the better of the current onslaught of space/naval wargames".

References

Board games introduced in 1976
Science fiction board wargames